Tiffany Kathryn Giardina (born November 4, 1993), known by her stage name Stalking Gia, is an American singer, songwriter, actress, model and entrepreneur.

She has been a recording artist since 2005, and performing under the stage name Stalking Gia since 2014. In 2020, she signed to Epic Records, releasing the single "The Kindest Thing" in April. Her newest single "Worship" was released on February 12, 2021 as part of an ongoing EP, Season 1.

Early life and career 

Born Tiffany Kathryn Giardina, Gia was raised in Westchester County, New York, in a town called Waccabuc. She started on Broadway at the age of five and performed as Molly in Annie as well as roles in Peter Pan and The Sound of Music. She was featured in television commercials for Cheerios and Major League Baseball. She also appeared in comedy sketches on Saturday Night Live and the Late Show with David Letterman. In 2006, she took part in the "62nd Annual Columbus Day Parade" in New York City.

At age 13, in 2005, Gia was signed by 785 Records. She released her debut studio album, No Average Angel, in 2009. The singles "No Average Angel" and "Hurry Up and Save Me" from the album were then featured on the soundtrack for the film, Another Cinderella Story. Giardina's song, "Shine", was also featured on the soundtrack for Disney's Tinker Bell. She also performed as the singing voice for the character of Keira in the 2012 animated film, Barbie: The Princess & the Popstar.

Stalking Gia 
In 2014, she changed her stage name to Stalking Gia, taking her longstanding World of Warcraft persona as her new artist name. She said, "Being an artist is basically saying, 'Hey world, feel free to stalk me.'" At the same time, she began releasing music independently. In 2020, she signed to Epic Records and released the single "The Kindest Thing" in April of that year. She is due to release an EP entitled Season 1 later in 2020, but has been since been pushed back to sometime in 2021.

Discography

Albums

Extended plays

Singles

As featured artist

Other appearances

References

External links 

 

1993 births
Living people
21st-century American singers
21st-century American women singers
American people of Italian descent
People from New York City